Patrik Kundrátek (born 15 February 1994) is a Czech football player who plays for FC Baník Ostrava.

Patrik Kundrátek has played international football at under-17 level for Czech Republic U17.

External links
 

1994 births
Living people
Czech footballers
Association football midfielders
FC Baník Ostrava players
Czech First League players
Czech Republic youth international footballers